The Central District of Galikash County is a district (bakhsh) in Galikash County, Golestan Province, Iran. At the 2006 census, its population was 41,202, in 9,711 families.  The District has one city: Galikash.  The District has two rural districts (dehestan): Nilkuh Rural District and Yanqaq Rural District.

References 

Districts of Golestan Province
Galikash County